Lina Domberg (born 28 October 1995) is a Swedish football goalkeeper.

Honours 
KIF Örebro DFF
Runner-up
 Damallsvenskan: 2014

References

External links 
 
 
 

1995 births
Living people
Swedish women's footballers
KIF Örebro DFF players
Damallsvenskan players
Women's association football goalkeepers